Hyphochytrids are eukaryotic organisms in the group of Stramenopiles (Heterokonta).

Characteristics
They are distinguished by an anterior tinsel flagellum on their zoospores.  Also they have a rhizoidal or hypha-like vegetative system (hence the prefix "Hypho-").

Classification
This group may be put alternatively at the phylum, class, subclass or order level, being referred to as Hyphochytriomycota, Hyphochytriomycetes (or Hyphochytrea), Hyphochytriomycetidae (or Hyphochytridae) and Hyphochytriales, respectively. The variants Hyphochytridiomycota and Hyphochytridiomycetes are also sometimes used, presumably by analogy to the Chytridiomycetes, or due to the perpetuation of a typographical error. However, the stem is Hyphochytri- (from Hyphochytrium) and not Hyphochytridi- (from Chytridium).

In the past the classes Hyphochytridiomycetes, Oomycetes and Chytridiomycetes were grouped together in the now obsolete taxon Mastigomycotina as fungi with flagellate spores or gametes.  Now the Chytridiomycetes are still considered true fungi, but the other two sub-groups are classified in the kingdom Protista, or in the group Stramenopiles.

Hyphochytriomycetes are closely related to Oomycetes.

Order Hyphochytriales Bessey 1950 ex Sparrow 1960
 Family Hyphochytriaceae Fischer 1892
 Genus Canteriomyces Sparrow 1960
 Genus Cystochytrium Ivimey Cook 1932
 Genus Hyphochytrium Zopf 1884 [Hyphophagus Minden 1911]
 Family Rhizidiomycetaceae Karling ex Kirk, Cannon & David 2001
 Genus Latrostium Zopf 1894
 Genus Reessia Fisch 1883
 Genus Rhizidiomyces Zopf 1884 [Rhizidiomycopsis Sparrow 1960]

Diversity
This is a relatively small group, composed of about 16 known species, which may be due in part, to sampling methods of scientists.

See also
Hyphochytrium
Zoospore

References

Bibliography
C.J. Alexopolous, Charles W. Mims, M. Blackwell et al., Introductory Mycology, 4th ed. John Wiley and Sons, Hoboken NJ, 2004.  .

External links
"Introduction to the Fungi". University of Hawai‘i at Mānoa Botany Department 
"Hyphochytriomycota". Index Fungorum.

Heterokont classes
Pseudofungi